Giovanni Koetting (born March 10, 1962 in Ivrea, Piedmont) is a retired Italian professional football player.

Honours
 Serie A champion: 1983/84.
 European Cup winner: 1984/85.
 UEFA Cup Winners' Cup winner: 1983/84.

1962 births
Living people
People from Ivrea
Italian footballers
Italy youth international footballers
Serie A players
Serie B players
Udinese Calcio players
S.P.A.L. players
Juventus F.C. players
A.C. Ancona players
A.S.D. Calcio Ivrea players
Association football midfielders
Footballers from Piedmont
Sportspeople from the Metropolitan City of Turin